Ranafast or Rinnafarset, officially only known by its Irish name Rann na Feirste is a Gaeltacht village and townland in the Rosses region of northwest County Donegal, Ireland.

Name
Ranafast, or sometimes Rannafast or Rinnafarset, is the anglicised version of the area’s original and official name Rann na Feirste.

Language
Ranafast is a Gaeltacht area, therefore the  Irish language is the predominantly spoken language. According to the 2016 census 90.4% of the population of Ranafast could speak Irish and 66.6% of the population spoke Irish daily outside the education system.

Arts and culture
The writers Séamus Ó Grianna and Seosamh Mac Grianna were born in Ranafast.

Education
Coláiste Bhríde

References

Gaeltacht places in County Donegal
Gaeltacht towns and villages
The Rosses
Townlands of County Donegal